Leslie Lievesley (July 1911 – 4 May 1949) was an English football player and manager. During his playing career, his regular position was at full-back.

Born in Staveley, Derbyshire, Lievesley started his career as an amateur with Rossington Main Colliery, where his father Joe was playing at the time while working at the nearby coal mine, following spells at Sheffield United and Arsenal. Leslie moved to Doncaster Rovers in 1929. After scoring 21 goals in 66 games, he was signed by Manchester United, but played with them during one of their less successful eras, when they were a Football League Second Division side. He then went to Chesterfield in March 1933, spent four seasons at Torquay United and two at Crystal Palace.

Following the start of the Second World War in 1939, Lievesley joined the Royal Air Force, where he became a parachute trainer and dispatch officer.

Following the war he became a coach in the Netherlands at Heracles Almelo, then in 1947, after turning down an offer from Marseille in France, transferred to Italian club Torino as youth team coach. He coached the Italy national team at the 1948 Summer Olympics and became first-team coach at Torino that year. In 1949 he had been offered a contract to coach rival team Juventus, when on 4 May he was one of 31 fatalities in the Superga air disaster that killed almost the entire Torino squad, when they were in the process of winning the Serie A title. He had previously survived two air crashes in the war and one in 1948 when travelling with the Torino youth team.

As well as his father, Joe, Lievesley's brothers Dennis and Ernest, and cousin Wilf were all professional footballers.

Honours

Manager
Torino
Serie A: 1948–49

Individual
Torino F.C. Hall of Fame: 2019

References

External links
MUFCInfo.com profile

1911 births
1949 deaths
People from Staveley, Derbyshire
Footballers from Derbyshire
English footballers
Association football defenders
Manchester United F.C. players
Rossington Main F.C. players
Doncaster Rovers F.C. players
Chesterfield F.C. players
Torquay United F.C. players
Doncaster Rovers F.C. wartime guest players
English Football League players
Torino F.C. non-playing staff
Heracles Almelo non-playing staff
Torino F.C. managers
Royal Air Force personnel of World War II
Royal Air Force airmen
English football managers
English expatriate football managers
Expatriate football managers in the Netherlands
English expatriate sportspeople in the Netherlands
Expatriate football managers in Italy
English expatriate sportspeople in Italy
Victims of the Superga air disaster